Black Diamond is a roller coaster at Knoebels' Amusement Resort in Elysburg, Pennsylvania. The ride has a steel track on a wooden frame. The roller coaster originally opened in 1960 as the Golden Nugget in Hunt's Pier, and it eventually became part of Morey's Piers in Wildwood, New Jersey, where it operated until 1999 and stood until 2008-early 2009. The ride was relocated to Knoebels and reopened on October 8, 2011, as Black Diamond.

History 

The Golden Nugget Mine Ride opened in July 1960 at Hunt's Pier on the newly constructed ocean side portion.  The Golden Nugget was built three stories high with the top floor giving riders a mine car ride through the “desert.” The coaster was specially designed for Hunt's Pier by the Philadelphia Toboggan Coasters and was engineered by John C. Allen. The owners of the Pier constructed the frame, track supports, and facade in the 1959 off season. Bill Tracy designed the ride’s western theme pieces through his Amusement Display company.
On December 11, 2008, Morey's Piers announced that the Golden Nugget would be demolished and that they would have a ceremony for the Golden Nugget on Saturday, January 31. 

On January 26, 2009 it was publicly announced that Knoebels' Amusement Resort had purchased the Golden Nugget track and trains from Morey's Piers. 

The Coaster was modified and rebuilt on the location where the park's former bald eagle habitat resided.  The eagle's habitat has been relocated. The Black Diamond opened on October 8, 2011.

See also
 2011 in amusement parks

References

Roller coasters introduced in 2011
Roller coasters in Pennsylvania